Justice League: Crisis on Two Earths is a 2010 American animated superhero film released on February 23, 2010. It is based on the abandoned direct-to-video feature Justice League: Worlds Collide, which was intended as a bridge between the then-concluding Justice League animated television series and its then forthcoming sequel series Justice League Unlimited. Crisis on Two Earths was reworked from the Worlds Collide script to remove references to the TV series' continuity. The film is directed by Lauren Montgomery and Sam Liu and written by Dwayne McDuffie.

The premise of Crisis on Two Earths is borrowed from the 1964 Gardner Fox Justice League of America #29–30 story entitled "Crisis on Earth-Three!" and the 2000 Grant Morrison JLA: Earth 2 graphic novel, with a heroic Lex Luthor from an alternate universe coming to the Justice League's universe for help against the Crime Syndicate. The film is the seventh of the DC Universe Animated Original Movies released by Warner Premiere and Warner Bros. Animation. The two-disc special edition also includes an animated short featuring the Spectre.

On August 11, 2015, Warner Home Video re-released the film in a combo pack which includes a DVD and Blu-Ray copy, a digital copy, and the graphic novel on which it was based.

Plot

In an alternate universe, heroic versions of Lex Luthor and Joker (called the Jester) are stealing a device called the "Quantum Trigger" from the headquarters of the Crime Syndicate (villainous version of the Justice League). When an alarm is tripped, the Jester sacrifices himself to allow Luthor to escape and kills J'edd J'arkus and Angelique (evil versions of Martian Manhunter and Hawkgirl respectively) with a bomb. Luthor is nearly captured by the remaining Syndicate members (Ultraman, Superwoman, Power Ring, Johnny Quick and Owlman) but escapes to the Earth of the Justice League by activating a device that enables interdimensional travel.

Luthor locates a police station, but is mistaken for the evil Luthor and ends up strip-searched. The Justice League is summoned and Superman's x-ray vision confirms Luthor's reversed organs indicate that he is from a parallel Earth and that their Luthor is still incarcerated at Stryker's Island. The Justice League take the alternate Luthor to the Watchtower, where they learn of the Syndicate threat. As the Justice League debates the matter, Luthor hides the Quantum Trigger on the satellite. With the exception of Batman, the rest of the Justice League (Superman, Wonder Woman, Green Lantern, Flash and Martian Manhunter) travel to Luthor's Earth.

Arriving at the parallel Justice League's base, the heroes attack Syndicate targets. After a successful series of raids in which they capture Ultraman, the League confront United States President Slade Wilson, who releases Ultraman and explains that acceding to the Syndicate's demands saves millions of lives, e.g. hardly anyone would be brave enough to testify against the Syndicate, lest it be nearly impossible to guarantee safety until trial. His daughter, Rose, however, regards him as a coward. Martian Manhunter inadvertently reads her mind and explains that as a military man her father actually holds life more dear than others. Martian Manhunter later foils an assassination attempt on Rose by Archer (an evil version of Green Arrow), and the pair fall in love.

Owlman has developed a weapon, the Quantum Eigenstate Device or Q.E.D., which the Syndicate intend to use as the equalizer to the threat of a nuclear reprisal. When pressed by Superwoman, Owlman reveals that he's secretly planning to overthrow Ultraman and take control of the Crime Syndicate. He also admits the weapon can destroy entire worlds. Believing there are many parallel Earths, and that each one develops from the choices that each person makes, Owlman becomes obsessed with the idea that nothing he does can possibly matter, as there will always be parallel worlds where he explored another option. As a result, he searches for Earth Prime, the very first Earth from which all other universes originated, intending to use the Q.E.D. to spark a chain reaction that will erase the entire multiverse. Superwoman is excited by the idea and agrees to help him. Owlman sends Superwoman with three of her lieutenants to the League's dimension, and on the Watchtower, they battle Batman, Aquaman, Black Canary, Black Lightning, Firestorm, and Red Tornado. Superwoman and one of her lieutenants escape with the Quantum Trigger but are followed by Batman.

After a fight that ended with him gaining a broken rib, Batman defeats Superwoman and summons the League. Johnny, hopeful to reinstate fear in the Syndicate, decides to come down to commit big crimes. Power Ring rejects this because Scarlet Archer had been arrested by J'onn. Rose decides to learn the location of the Syndicate base to allow the Justice League to confront them. The League arrives at the Crime Syndicate's moon-base with the captive Superwoman, and eventually battle the Syndicate. Owlman fights off Batman and takes the Q.E.D. bomb to Earth-Prime, finding it to be uninhabited and lifeless, having suffered an unknown cataclysm that caused it to leave solar orbit. Luthor speculates that a speedster might be able to vibrate and match the temporal vibration of the teleported Q.E.D. device and open a portal. Flash volunteers but Batman states that he isn't fast enough, only Johnny Quick is. Johnny agrees and opens a portal.

Batman pursues Owlman to Earth-Prime, where they engage in a brutal battle. Owlman espouses his nihilistic philosophy, claiming that Mankind destroyed Earth-Prime, and that destroying Man in every universe is the only possible real choice to make. As they fight, both of them notice how similar they are to one another. Batman eventually manages to teleport Owlman and the Q.E.D. device to another uninhabited Earth, but not before telling Owlman, “There is a difference between you and me. We both looked into the abyss. But when it looked back, you blinked.” Seeing that the Q.E.D. is triggered, Owlman does not attempt to defuse the bomb, simply saying "It doesn't matter,” with a smirk and allowing the bomb to destroy the alternate Earth, killing himself in the process. Batman returns to the Syndicate's Earth, where the strain of acting as a vibratory conduit has exhausted Johnny Quick to near death. Before dying, Johnny correctly deduces Batman lied about Flash not being fast enough and knew what would happen. Despite this, he shows no ill will toward Batman and appreciates Batman’s ruse, dying with a smile. Martian Manhunter returns, accompanied by President Wilson and the Marines, and together they arrest Ultraman, Superwoman, and Power Ring.

Wilson thanks the heroes for helping save their world and tells them he had ordered the National Guard to support the local police forces and resume on arresting the remaining members of the Syndicate. Although Rose asks Martian Manhunter to remain with her, the group return to their dimension. Batman and Superman later discuss a membership drive with the five heroes summoned previously greeting the Justice League while Wonder Woman keeps Owlman’s invisible jet.

Voice cast
 William Baldwin as Bruce Wayne / Batman
 Mark Harmon as Clark Kent / Superman
 Chris Noth as Lex Luthor
 Gina Torres as Superwoman
 James Woods as Owlman
 Brian Bloom as Ultraman
 Jonathan Adams as J'onn J'onzz / Martian Manhunter
 Josh Keaton as Wally West / Flash (credited), Aquaman (uncredited)
 Vanessa Marshall as Princess Diana / Wonder Woman
 Bruce Davison as President Slade Wilson
 Freddi Rogers as Rose Wilson
 James Patrick Stuart as Johnny Quick (credited), The Jester (uncredited)
 Nolan North as Hal Jordan / Green Lantern (credited), Power Ring (uncredited)
 Jim Meskimen as Captain Super (credited), Archer (uncredited)
 Kari Wührer as Model Citizen (credited), Black Canary (uncredited)
 Bruce Timm as Uncle Super (credited), Captain Super Jr. (uncredited)
 Carlos Alazraqui as Breakdance (credited), Secret Service Agent (uncredited)
 Cedric Yarbrough as Firestorm (credited), Black Power (uncredited), Black Lightning (uncredited)
 Richard Green as Mister Action
 Andrea Romano as Watchtower Computer (credited), Reporter (uncredited)

Production 
In 2004, Bruce Timm revealed that a DCAU direct-to-video Justice League feature was in development to connect Justice League and Justice League Unlimited. The film was titled as Justice League: Worlds Collide. One of the objectives of the film was to explain how Wonder Woman acquired her Invisible-Jet. The project was ultimately scrapped by Warner Bros.; however, in 2008, Timm stated that Justice League: Worlds Collide could be released someday in the future.

Finally, Worlds Collide was rewritten by Dwayne McDuffie for DC Universe Animated Original Movies as Justice League: Crisis on Two Earths, but removing all connections with the animated series.

Soundtrack

Reception
Justice League: Crisis on Two Earths received positive reviews. The World's Finest stated "...the film ranks up there as one of Dwayne McDuffie's better works in the animated DC world and even though it’s reminiscent of stories we’ve seen in animation before, the brilliant work done by Moi, the directing by Sam Liu and Lauren Montgomery, and story make it more than worth watching again."

It earned $9.2 million from domestic home video sales.

See also 
Justice League: Doom, a standalone sequel also written by McDuffie and using the same character designs.

References

External links

 
 
 Justice League: Crisis on Two Earths @ The World's Finest

2010 animated films
2010 direct-to-video films
2010 films
2010s animated superhero films
Animated Justice League films
DC Universe Animated Original Movies
2010s English-language films
Films about nuclear war and weapons
Films about parallel universes
2010s American animated films
2010s direct-to-video animated superhero films
Films directed by Sam Liu
Films directed by Lauren Montgomery
Films scored by James L. Venable
Animated science fiction films
2010s science fiction films